The leathery grunter (Scortum hillii) is a species of fish in the family Terapontidae. It is endemic to Queensland (Australia).  The eggs are fanned and guarded by the male parent.

References

leathery grunter
Freshwater fish of Queensland
leathery grunter
Taxa named by François-Louis Laporte, comte de Castelnau
Taxonomy articles created by Polbot